Monte Pfeffer (October 8, 1891 – September 27, 1941) born Montague Pfeiffer, was an American Major League Baseball infielder. He played for the Philadelphia Athletics during the  season.

References

Major League Baseball infielders
Philadelphia Athletics players
Baseball players from New York (state)
1891 births
1941 deaths